Peddlin' in Society or Down With Riches! is a 1946 Italian romance-drama film directed by Gennaro Righelli. it was a loose sequel to the 1945 film Down with Misery by the same director and also starring Magnani.

Cast 
Anna Magnani as Gioconda Perfetti
Vittorio De Sica as il conte Ghirani
Virgilio Riento as Don Nicola
Laura Gore as Anna 
Zora Piazza as Lucia Perfetti 
John Garson as Lucky Brandy 
Lauro Gazzolo as Commendator Bardacò
Giuseppe Porelli as Bonifazio 
Vittorio Mottini as Nino 
Galeazzo Benti as Rorò di Torretia
Vito Annichiarico as Little Tranquillo
Domenico Gambino as Tranquillo's Uncle
Checco Durante as Greengrocer
Anita Durante as Caterina
Dina Romano as Marquise of Mendoza
Enrico Glori as Commissioner 
Edda Soligo as  Zefira 
Maria Grazia Francia

References

Bibliography
 Burke, Frank. A Companion to Italian Cinema. John Wiley & Sons, 2017.

External links

1946 films
1946 romantic drama films
Italian romantic drama films
Films directed by Gennaro Righelli
Italian black-and-white films
1940s Italian films